Olivier Lontchi, (born June 8, 1983 in Cameroon) is a Cameroon-born Canada based professional boxer who fights in the super bantamweight division. Lontchi is the current NABA super bantamweight champion and like fellow Cameroon born fighter Herman Ngoudjo he is trained by Howard Grant and based in Montreal.

Amateur career
Lontchi represented the Cameroon as an amateur boxer. He won a bronze medal in the featherweight division at the 2001 Francophone Games in Ottawa. Following this he and Ngoudjo, who also won a bronze, remained in Canada and they continue to be based there.

Professional career

Debut
Lontchi turned professional in September 2004 at Club Soda, Montreal, Quebec, Canada on an undercard of  bill that included stablemate Walid Smichet. In his debut Lontchi drew with Limoilou's Dave Drouin, six month later the pair would fight again and that time Lontchi won with a fourth round knockout.

Canadian featherweight title
Lontchi remained unbeaten and in 2006 he fought Jason Adams for his Canadian featherweight title in Adams' home province of Alberta. Lontchi knocked out Adams in the ninth of a scheduled ten rounds with an overhand right that left Adams on the canvas for several minutes. Adams had never been stopped in any of his previous fights and following this Lontchi was awarded the prize for Knockout of the Year at the 2006 Canadian Fightnews awards.

NABA and WBO NABO super bantamweight titles
Six straight victories later Lontchi dropped down a weight to the super bantamweight division to face former Mexican and WBO bantamweight champion Cruz Carbajal for both the NABA and WBO NABO belts. Carbajal was the vastly more experience fighter having challenged for the a variety of world title and this being Lontchi's first fight at super bantam and for an international title. Despite this Lontchi produced a master class with his speed overcoming Carbajal power and he went on to win a clear points victory over twelve rounds with only one judge giving Carbajal a single round.

Professional record 

|- style="margin:0.5em auto; font-size:95%;"
|align="center" colspan=8|18 Wins (8 knockouts), 3 Losses, 2 Draw
|- style="margin:0.5em auto; font-size:95%;"
!Result
!Record
!Opponent
!Type
!Round, time
!Date
!Location
!Notes
|-
|Loss
|
|align=left| Tyler Asselstine
|UD
|8
|04/09/2013
|align=left| Fairmont Royal York, Toronto, Ontario, Canada
|align=left|
|-
|Loss
|
|align=left| Mikey Garcia
|KO
|5 (10)
|12/04/2010
|align=left| Honda Center, Anaheim, California, U.S.
|align=left|
|-
|Loss
|
|align=left| Juan Manuel López
|RTD
|9 (12)
|06/27/2009
|align=left| Boardwalk Hall, Atlantic City, New Jersey, U.S.
|align=left|
|-
|Win
|
|align=left| Cecilio Santos
|KO
|7 (12)
|04/04/2009
|align=left| Montreal Casino, Montreal, Quebec, Canada
|align=left|
|-
|Win
|
|align=left| Ruben Estanislao
|KO
|2 (10)
|11/01/2008
|align=left| Montreal Casino, Montreal, Quebec, Canada
|align=left|
|-
|Draw
|
|align=left| Eduardo Garcia
|PTS
|10
|08/29/2008
|align=left| Casino Rama, Rama, Ontario, Canada
|align=left|
|-
|Win
|
|align=left| Roberto Lopez
|UD
|12
|03/08/2008
|align=left| Montreal Casino, Montreal, Quebec, Canada
|align=left|
|-
|Win
|
|align=left| Henry Arjona
|UD
|8
|02/09/2008
|align=left| Montreal Casino, Montreal, Quebec, Canada
|align=left|
|-
|Win
|
|align=left| Cruz Carbajal
|UD
|12
|11/10/2007
|align=left| Montreal Casino, Montreal, Quebec, Canada
|align=left|
|-
|Win
|
|align=left| Fermin de los Santos
|UD
|8
|08/03/2007
|align=left| Centre Pierre Charbonneau, Montreal, Quebec, Canada
|align=left|
|-
|Win
|
|align=left| Osvaldo Lara
|KO
|2 (8)
|04/14/2007
|align=left| Montreal Casino, Montreal, Quebec, Canada
|align=left|
|-
|Win
|
|align=left| Roman Campos
|TKO
|5 (8)
|03/10/2007
|align=left| Montreal Casino, Montreal, Quebec, Canada
|align=left|
|-
|Win
|
|align=left| Mike Pare
|TKO
|10
|11/18/2006
|align=left| Colisée de Trois-Rivières, Trois-Rivières, Quebec, Canada
|align=left|
|-
|Win
|
|align=left| Giovanni Caro
|UD
|6
|09/30/2006
|align=left| Montreal Casino, Montreal, Quebec, Canada
|align=left|
|-
|Win
|
|align=left| Saul Gutierrez Hernandez
|UD
|4
|05/24/2006
|align=left| Métropolis, Montreal, Quebec, Canada
|align=left|
|-
|Win
|
|align=left| Jason Adams
|KO
|9 (10)
|04/13/2006
|align=left| Capri Centre, Red Deer, Alberta, Canada
|align=left|
|-
|Win
|
|align=left| Hardy Paredes
|UD
|8
|02/25/2006
|align=left| Casino du Lac-Leamy, Gatineau, Quebec, Canada
|align=left|
|-
|Win
|
|align=left| Mathias Tchikaya
|UD
|4
|10/12/2005
|align=left| Árena de Grand-Mère, Grand-Mère, Quebec, Canada
|align=left|
|-
|Win
|
|align=left| Bobby Conners
|TKO
|3 (4)
|10/01/2005
|align=left| Delta Hotel, Trois-Rivières, Quebec, Canada
|align=left|
|-
|Win
|
|align=left| Stephen Rose
|UD
|6
|07/13/2005
|align=left| Métropolis, Montreal, Quebec, Canada
|align=left|
|-
|Win
|
|align=left| Dave Drouin
|TKO
|4 (6)
|04/16/2005
|align=left| Le Colibri, Victoriaville, Quebec, Canada
|align=left|
|-
|Win
|
|align=left| Alex Cruz
|UD
|4
|12/01/2004
|align=left| Club Soda, Montreal, Quebec, Canada
|align=left|
|-
|Draw
|
|align=left| Dave Drouin
|PTS
|4
|09/29/2004
|align=left| Club Soda, Montreal, Quebec, Canada
|align=left|
|}

References

External links
 

1983 births
Living people
Cameroonian male boxers
Canadian male boxers
Super-bantamweight boxers